Uyghuristan (also spelled Uyghurstan, Uighuristan or Uighurstan), meaning "land of the Uyghurs", may refer to:

East Turkestan, especially as a proposed independent Uyghur homeland in the Tarim Basin of China
Xinjiang, an autonomous region of the People's Republic of China (PRC) 
Qocho, a medieval Uyghur kingdom
The eastern part of Moghulistan; Hami-Turpan

See also
History of the Uyghur people